The women's 1500 metres at the 2008 Summer Olympics took place from 21–23 August at the Beijing National Stadium.

The qualifying standards were 4:07.00 (A standard) and 4:08.00 (B standard).

This event was hit hard by the Russian doping scandal on 31 July 2008, as all three Russian entrants, Yuliya Fomenko, Tatyana Tomashova and Yelena Soboleva, were suspended from competition. These athletes were three of the favourites to take the medals in Beijing.

Records
Prior to this competition, the existing world and Olympic records were as follows:

No new world or Olympic records were set for this event.

Results

Round 1

Qualification: First 3 in each heat(Q) and the next 3 fastest(q) advance to the final.

Final

Splits

References

Athletics at the 2008 Summer Olympics
1500 metres at the Olympics
2008 in women's athletics
Women's events at the 2008 Summer Olympics